The Bufalino crime family, also known as the Pittston crime family, Scranton Wilkes-Barre crime family, Northeastern Pennsylvania crime family, Northeastern Pennsylvania Mafia, or Scranton Mafia, was an Italian-American Mafia crime family active in Northeastern Pennsylvania, primarily in the cities of Scranton, Wilkes-Barre, and Pittston.

History

Barbara and the Apalachin meeting

In November 1957, Joseph Barbara held a national Cosa Nostra meeting at his Apalachin, New York, estate. The meeting was preceded by the assassination of Albert Anastasia by a few weeks, as well as a smaller meeting at the New Jersey estate of Ruggiero Boiardo. The Apalachin meeting was attended by about 100 Mafia heads from the U.S., Italy and Cuba. A raid by New York State Police caught many heads of families or their deputies. Many other family heads and their deputies were suspected of being present by law enforcement but evaded detection and capture. All those apprehended were fined, up to $10,000 each, and given prison sentences ranging from three to five years, however, all the convictions were overturned on appeal in 1960.<ref>United States of America, Appellee v. Russell Bufalino et..</ref>

Bufalino era
With Barbara's death in June 1959, the Mafia Commission recognized Russell Bufalino as the official family boss. Bufalino maintained a close alliance with the New York Genovese family. After Bufalino was imprisoned in the late 1970s on extortion charges related to the collection of a debt, his underboss, Edward Sciandra, became the acting boss of the family. Sciandra was aided in running the family by captains Anthony Guarnieri, James David Osticco, and Phillip Medico, Consigliere Remo Allio, as well as soldiers William D'Elia, Angelo Bufalino, John Rizzo, Angelo Son, and Joseph Sperrazza. Bufalino was released from prison in 1980 briefly after serving his sentence for extortion. Towards the end of 1981 Bufalino was again imprisoned after being found guilty of conspiring to kill Jack Napoli, a witness in his 1978 extortion trial. Bufalino learned the whereabouts of Napoli, then in the Witness Protection Program, and conspired with Los Angeles mobster Jimmy Fratianno and another man he met in prison to murder Napoli. Fratianno turned government informant and testified against Bufalino at trial. He was sentenced to ten years imprisonment and released in 1989. Russell Bufalino died on February 25, 1994, of natural causes near Pittston, Pennsylvania.

D'Elia's leadership
William "Big Billy" D'Elia became the new boss of the Bufalino crime family after the death of boss Russell Bufalino in 1994 and later, the retirement of Acting Boss Edward Sciandra. D'Elia started his criminal career in the Bufalino family in the late 1960s as Bufalino's driver, after his late sister married the only son of capo James David Osticco. According to the Pennsylvania Crime Commission, D'Elia was placed in the crew of Caporegime Phillip Medico. D'Elia advanced through the ranks of the organization rather quickly, due to the natural attrition of members and indictments in the 1980s and 1990s. He took over the crime family's solid waste rackets, and oversaw the traditional Mafia rackets run by the members and associates of the family. D'Elia also attempted to replenish the aging ranks of the family, with limited success. As boss, D'Elia worked with the other crime families in New York City, Pittsburgh, Philadelphia, Southern Florida, and Los Angeles. In the 1990s, D'Elia was linked to a money laundering scheme involving numerous Northeastern Pennsylvania bookmakers, escort services, corrupt politicians, and associates of Russian organized crime. D'Elia was closely aligned with the Philadelphia crime family. When Philadelphia crime family boss John Stanfa was imprisoned, D'Elia was one of Stanfa's choices as interim caretaker of the family.

On May 31, 2001, agents from the Criminal Investigation Division of the IRS, US Postal Inspectors, and Pennsylvania State Police executed search warrants at the homes of D'Elia, his mistress Jeanie Stanton, Thomas Joseph, and Marranca, who has been identified as an informant working for the FBI and the Pennsylvania State Police. Marranca also testified on behalf of authorities against Louis DeNaples in front of the Fourth Statewide Investigating Grand Jury, in regards to DeNaples' mob ties and his ownership of the Mount Airy Casino. On February 26, 2003, D'Elia was banned from entering any Atlantic City, New Jersey, casinos by the New Jersey Division of Gaming Enforcement, based on information shared by the Federal Bureau of Investigation and the Pennsylvania Crime Commission.

On May 31, 2006, D'Elia was indicted on federal charges of laundering $600,000 in illegal drug proceeds obtained from a Florida-based associate of the Bufalino crime family among others, including Lucchese family associate Phillip "Fipper" Forgione. While D'Elia was free on bail, he solicited a U.S. Customs Agency informant to murder a witness in the case and was remanded to prison until his eventual guilty plea and sentencing."Reputed mobster gets 9 years in prison" The Daily Item November 24, 2008 In March 2008, D'Elia pleaded guilty to witness tampering and money laundering. He was sentenced to nine years in prison. D'Elia cooperated with the government and testified against Louis DeNaples, the owner of Mount Airy Casino Resort in the Poconos. In 2010, D'Elia got two years dropped from his sentence for his assisting the government's investigation against DeNaples.

Status
In 2011, author Dave Janoski interviewed former Pennsylvania Crime Commission investigator James Kanavy who asserted that there is no longer a standalone family in Northeastern Pennsylvania, and that any remnants of the Mafia family would be aligned with the New York families.

Historical leadership
Boss (official and acting)
 1900–1905: Tommaso Petto — killed
 1905–1908: Stefano LaTorre — stepped down
 1908–1933: Santo Volpe — retired in 1933
 1933–1949: Giovanni "John" Sciandra — died of natural causes in 1949. There is a common misconception he was murdered in 1940, but newspaper articles confirm he died of natural causes in 1949.
 1949–1959: Giuseppe "Joe the Barber" Barbara, Sr. — had a heart attack in 1956 and died in 1959.
 Acting 1956–1959: Rosario Alberto "Russell" Bufalino — became boss
 1959–1994: Rosario Alberto "Russell" Bufalino — imprisoned from 1978–1989; retired, he died on February 25, 1994
 Acting 1975-1989: Edward "Eddie The Conductor" Sciandra — imprisoned 1981–1982; he received help from Anthony Guarnieri and William D'Elia
 Acting 1990–1994: William "Big Billy" D'Elia — became boss
 1994–2008: William "Big Billy" D'Elia — in 2006 he was indicted on money laundering charges, in 2008 he pleaded guilty and testified in front of a grand jury for leniency.Reputed mob boss gets prison term shortened by Matt Birkbeck. The Morning Call. June 30, 2010

Former members
 James Osticco: served as underboss to Russell Bufalino. Died in 1990.
 Edward "Eddie the Conductor" Sciandra: served as consigliere to Russell Bufalino. Died in 2003.
 Angelo Polizzi: served as consigliere to Giovanni Sciandra. He moved to Detroit and started the Polizzi line of L.C.N. figures in the Detroit area.
 Anthony F. Guarnieri: former caporegime, died in 1992 
 Frank Cannone: former soldier, deceased, he ran a bookmaking operation in Binghamton, New York.
 Anthony J. Mosco: former soldier, he was active in Binghamton, New York Mosco served 17 years in federal prison for racketeering along with capo Anthony "Guv" Guarnieri and other family members and associates. He currently resides in Arizona and Florida and has been seen visiting with family members and associates in the Pittston area in recent years.
 Frank "The Irishman" Sheeran: former associate and right-hand man to Russell Bufalino. He was indicted in July 1980 with six others on labour racketeering charges, and on October 31, 1980, he was convicted and sentenced to a 32 year prison term, he served 13 years and was released in 1993. He died at age 83 on December 14, 2003. 

 References 

Further reading
 George Anastasia. The Goodfella Tapes (Avon, 1998). .
 Charles Brandt .I Heard You Paint Houses: Frank "The Irishman" Sheeran and the Inside Story of the Mafia, the Teamsters, and the Final Ride of Jimmy Hoffa (Steerforth, 2004). .
 Matt Birkbeck. The Quiet Don: The Untold Story of Mafia Kingpin Russell Bufalino'' (Berkley/Penguin, 2013). 

 
Organizations established in 1900
1900 establishments in Pennsylvania
Organizations disestablished in 2008
2008 disestablishments in Pennsylvania
Defunct organizations based in Pennsylvania
Pittston, Pennsylvania
Italian-American crime families
Gangs in New York (state)
Gangs in Pennsylvania
Italian-American culture in Pennsylvania